Eighth and Center Streets Baptist Church is a historic African-American Baptist church located at 722 Center Street in Hannibal, Marion County, Missouri. It was built in 1872, and is a red brick, two-level rectangular Romanesque Revival building measuring approximately 70 feet long by 40 feet wide.

It was listed on the National Register of Historic Places in 1980.  It is located in the Central Park Historic District and Maple Avenue Historic District.

References

Individually listed contributing properties to historic districts on the National Register in Missouri
Baptist churches in Missouri
African-American history of Missouri
Churches on the National Register of Historic Places in Missouri
Romanesque Revival church buildings in Missouri
Churches completed in 1872
Buildings and structures in Hannibal, Missouri
National Register of Historic Places in Marion County, Missouri
Churches in Ralls County, Missouri